Pollard's rho algorithm is an algorithm for integer factorization. It was invented by John Pollard in 1975. It uses only a small amount of space, and its expected running time is proportional to the square root of the smallest prime factor of the composite number being factorized.

Core ideas 
The algorithm is used to factorize a number , where  is a non-trivial factor. A polynomial modulo , called  (e.g.), is used to generate a pseudorandom sequence. It is important to note that  must be a polynomial. The sequence is related to another sequence . Since  is not known beforehand, this sequence cannot be explicitly computed in the algorithm. Yet, in it lies the core idea of the algorithm.

Because the number of possible values for these sequences is finite, both the  sequence, which is mod , and  sequence will eventually repeat, even though these values are unknown. If the sequences were to behave like random numbers, the birthday paradox implies that the number of  before a repetition occurs would be expected to be , where  is the number of possible values. So the sequence  will likely repeat much earlier than the sequence .

Once a sequence has a repeated value, the sequence will cycle, because each value depends only on the one before it.

In each step, one moves to the next node in the sequence and the other moves forward by two nodes. After that, it is checked whether . If it is not 1, then this implies that there is a repetition in the  sequence (i.e. . Although this always happens eventually, the resulting greatest common divisor (GCD) is a divisor of  other than 1. This may be  itself, since the two sequences might repeat at the same time. In this (uncommon) case the algorithm fails, and can be repeated with a different parameter.

Algorithm 
In the original algorithm, but nowadays it is more common to use . It performs the following steps:

 algorithm Pollard's rho algorithm is
     x ← 2
     y ← 2
     d ← 1
 
     while d = 1:
         x ← g(x)
         y ← g(g(y))
         d ← gcd(|x - y|, n)
 
     if d = n: 
         return failure
     else:
         return d

Note that this algorithm may fail to find a nontrivial factor even when  is composite. In that case, the method can be tried again, using a starting value other than 2 or a different .

Example factorization 

97 is a non-trivial factor of 8051. Starting values other than  may give the cofactor (83) instead of 97. Note that even after a repetition, the GCD can return to 1.

Variants 
In 1980, Richard Brent published a faster variant of the rho algorithm. He used the same core ideas as Pollard but a different method of cycle detection, replacing Floyd's cycle-finding algorithm with the related Brent's cycle finding method.

A further improvement was made by Pollard and Brent. They observed that if , then also  for any positive integer . In particular, instead of computing  at every step, it suffices to define  as the product of 100 consecutive  terms modulo , and then compute a single . A major speed up results as 100  steps are replaced with 99 multiplications modulo  and a single . Occasionally it may cause the algorithm to fail by introducing a repeated factor, for instance when  is a square. But it then suffices to go back to the previous  term, where , and use the regular ρ algorithm from there.

Application 
The algorithm is very fast for numbers with small factors, but slower in cases where all factors are large. The ρ algorithm's most remarkable success was the 1980 factorization of the Fermat number  = 1238926361552897 × 93461639715357977769163558199606896584051237541638188580280321. The ρ algorithm was a good choice for  because the prime factor  = 1238926361552897 is much smaller than the other factor. The factorization took 2 hours on a UNIVAC 1100/42.

Example: factoring  = 10403 = 101 · 103 

The third and fourth columns of the table contain additional information not known by the algorithm.
They are included to show how the algorithm works. 

The first repetition modulo 101 is 97 which occurs in step 17. The repetition is not detected until step 23, when . This causes  to be , and a factor is found.

Complexity 
If the pseudorandom number  occurring in the Pollard ρ algorithm were an actual random number, it would follow that success would be achieved half the time, by the Birthday paradox in  iterations. It is believed that the same analysis applies as well to the actual rho algorithm, but this is a heuristic claim, and rigorous analysis of the algorithm remains open.

See also  
 Pollard's rho algorithm for logarithms
 Pollard's kangaroo algorithm

References

Further reading

External links 
 Comprehensive article on Pollard's Rho algorithm aimed at an introductory-level audience
 

 Java Implementation
 About Pollard rho

Integer factorization algorithms